Arthur Wakefield Carkeek  (1843 – 24 May 1897) was a member of the Armed Constabulary in the New Zealand Wars, and was one of only 23 recipients of the New Zealand Cross for gallantry. Later he was a civil engineer and land surveyor.

Early life
He was born in Nelson in 1843, a son of Stephen Carkeek, and brother of Frances Ann Stewart (née Carkeek).

Military career
He was a Sergeant in the Armed Constabulary at Ohinemutu during the Te Kooti's War episode of the New Zealand Wars. On 7 February 1870 the force of Arawas under Captain Mair at Ohinemutu was attacked by Te Kooti and his force. Thomas McDonnell needed to be told of the location of Te Kooti and his force, but Carkeek could not find a Māori willing to go thirty miles through the bush to McDonnell at Tapapa. He decided to go himself, and a Māori agreed to accompany him. They started at daylight on the 8th, and arrived at Tapapa about 3 pm, after traversing dense bush where they were likely to be surprised by the enemy.

Later life and death
He was an engineer and land surveyor based in Ōtaki. He married Eydthe Muller, the second daughter of Stephen Lunn Muller, at Blenheim on 2 December 1873; they had a son and daughter.

He died on 24 May 1897 in Wairau Hospital, Blenheim, aged 54 years. He was buried at Omaka Cemetery, Blenheim, with military and Masonic ceremony.

References 

Obituary in Marlborough Express of 25 May 1897, p. 2 
The Colonial New Zealand Wars by Tim Ryan and Bill Parham p. 214 (1986, Wellington, Grantham House)  
Paragraph in Cyclopedia of New Zealand, 1897
Digitised collection items related to Arthur Carkeek including medals and photographs
Digitised notebook of Survey of Part of the Rangitumau Block for Scandinavian Immigrants, 1872 (and other sketches) by A.W. Carkeek

New Zealand military personnel
People of the New Zealand Wars
People from Nelson, New Zealand
New Zealand surveyors
New Zealand engineers
Recipients of the New Zealand Cross (1869)
People from Ōtaki, New Zealand
1843 births
1897 deaths
Burials at Omaka Cemetery
19th-century New Zealand engineers
19th-century New Zealand military personnel